Oleg Tarnovschi (born 10 April 1992) is a Moldovan sprint canoeist. He competed in the men's C-1 200 metres event at the 2016 Summer Olympics.

References

External links
 

1992 births
Living people
Moldovan male canoeists
Olympic canoeists of Moldova
Canoeists at the 2016 Summer Olympics
European Games competitors for Moldova
Canoeists at the 2015 European Games
Canoeists at the 2019 European Games
ICF Canoe Sprint World Championships medalists in Canadian
Sportspeople from Lviv